Nikos Melissis (born 1936) is a former Greek footballer who played as a defender and a former manager.

Club career
Melissis first played football in the plains of Perissos and the local PAO Kalogreza. In July 1953, he was transferred to AEK, through the stockbroker, Tranopoulos, receiving as a transfer premium the amount of 6,000 drachmas. He initially played as a center forward, but did not make many appearances. In 1956, the manager of the club at the time, Tryfon Tzanetis at some training tested Melissis as a defender, as he recognized his potential for this position and his high jump and he was justified since the latter played very well. In fact, the footballer himself considered that he might not have the best possible career if he continued playing as a striker, while he stated that he particularly liked the high game. He continued his career playing mainly in the defense, the midfield and wherever he was asked to. He was a member of the team that won the Cup in 1956, but did not play in final at the Leoforos Alexandras Stadium on 24 June against Olympiacos, where the yellow-blacks won by 2–1. But in a match against PAOK at Toumba Stadium, in his attempt to stop the ball with a projection to save the goal from PAOK's Kourikidis, he suffered a quadriceps tear. He never fully recovered from his injury. Furthermore, the acquisition of the striker turned defender, Giannis Marditsis from Egaleo in 1959 left no space for Melissis in the main squad. He left the club in 1961, managing to play 2 times in the first national division.

International career
Melissis played some matches for Greece U19 in 1956 and he also was a part of the Greek military team.

Managerial career
In 1960 Melissis started his career as a coach at PAO Kalogreza. He won the Athens FCA League in 1964 and the promotion to the second national division. He managed the team until 1967, when the Junta merged the club with PAO Samfrapolis to create Ikaros Athens. Afterwards he became the general leader of Ikaros.

Personal life
Melissis participates in the events of the Veterans Association of AEK Athens.

Honours

As a player

AEK Athens
Greek Cup: 1955–56

As a manager

PAO Kalogreza
Athens FCA League: 1963–64

References

Living people
1936 births
AEK Athens F.C. players
Footballers from Athens
Greek footballers
Association football defenders
Greek football managers